A gameframe is a hybrid computer system that was first used in the online video game industry. It is an amalgamation of the different technologies and architectures for supercomputers and mainframes, namely high computing power and high throughput.

History 
In 2007, Hoplon and IBM jointly started the gameframe project in which they used an IBM System z mainframe computer with attached Cell/B.E. blades (the eight-core parallel-processing chips that power Sony's PlayStation 3) to host their online game Taikodom.
The project was carried further by a co-operation between IBM and the University of California, San Diego in 2009.

Although the Cell blades account for the required computing power, it's the high data throughput of the mainframe which is of particular interest.

System z provides a high level of security and massive workload handling, assuring the execution of its administrative tasks and guaranteeing an enduring connectivity to a huge number of clients. Cell/B.E. takes over the most resource demanding calculations thus enabling the System z to fulfill its job.

The combination is both an effective and financially attractive game server system, as the most computation-intensive tasks are offloaded from the expensive CPU cycles of System z and are carried out on the much more economical Cell blades. Without offloading, the server system required would end up costing too much and would not be financially feasible.

The gameframe can handle the required transactions (e.g. keeping track of each user's spaceships, weapons, and virtual money even between the players) and the simulation (trajectory of objects and checking for collisions) in a unified and consistent fashion.
Thus, it can host a few thousand users at a time and higher efficiency is experienced when more users are added.

Games with numerous players like World of Warcraft have tackled this problem by splitting the work among multiple clusters, creating duplicate worlds that don't communicate.

The Cell-augmented mainframe runs Hoplon's virtual-world middleware, called bitVerse, which uses IBM's WebSphere XD and DB2 software.

Around the gameframe, the IBM Virtual Universe Community has evolved.

References

External links 
 "To Probe Further: The Gameframe Guild" Aug 2008 at ieee.org
 "Mainframes on the Cutting Edge of Technology: Hoplon Infotainment’s Gameframe"  Sept 11, 2008 at mainframezone.com
 "Sun and I.B.M. to Offer New Class of High-End Servers" Apr 26, 2007 at nytimes.com

Videos 
 Hoplon Infotainment, Brazil startup and maker of Taikodom online video game 27 Apr 2009 at YouTube
 Brazil Trip -- Hoplon Infotainment 20 Sept 2007 at YouTube
 Mainframes in Brazil 20 Sept 2007 at YouTube

Cell BE architecture
IBM mainframe computers
Massively multiplayer online role-playing games
Server hardware
Computing terminology
Classes of computers